Diethyl selenide is an organoselenium compound with the formula . First reported in 1836, it was the first organoselenium compound to be discovered. It is the selenium analogue of diethyl ether. It has a strong and unpleasant smell.

Occurrence
Diethyl selenide has been detected in biofuel produced from plantain peel.
It is also a minor air pollutant in some areas.

Preparation
It may be prepared by a substitution reaction similar to the Williamson ether synthesis: reaction of a metal selenide, such as sodium selenide, with two equivalents of ethyl iodide or similar reagent to supply the ethyl groups:

References 

Organoselenium compounds
Foul-smelling chemicals